Prevenient grace (or preceding grace or enabling grace) is a Christian theological concept that refers to the grace of God in a person's life which precedes and prepares to conversion. The concept was first developed by Augustine of Hippo (354 – 430), was affirmed by the Second Council of Orange (529) and has become part of Catholic theology. It is also present in Reformed theology, through the form of an effectual calling leading some individuals irresistibly to salvation. It is also in Arminian theology, according to which it is dispensed universally in order to enable people to respond to the offer of salvation, though it does not ensure personal acceptance.

Definition 
The concept of "prevenient grace" was originated and developed by Augustine of Hippo (354 – 430), based on St. Ambrose's (c. 339 – c. 397) writings. Prevenient grace refers to the grace of God in a person's life that precedes conversion. The original expression means literally "grace that precedes". The English expression comes from an archaic usage of the word "prevenient" meaning "preceding". This concept have a similar meaning with the concept of "vocation" or "calling".

There are some variations of understanding of the prevenient grace, in terms of intend of God:
 In Arminian theology, it is an enabling grace which helps to believe.
 In Roman Catholicism theology, it is an assisting grace which helps to believe.
 In Reformed theology, it is comparable simultaneously to two concepts: common grace which doesn't improve man's depraved unregenerate nature and has no salvific purpose and the effectual calling by which God calls to irresistibly believe.

When grace is considered with regard to its effects, prevenient grace is differentiated from subsequent grace. The nature of subsequent grace differs depending on the view on the deterministic or non-deterministic nature of the providence of God : For example, John Wesley, named 2 forms of subsequent grace : "justifying grace" (also called saving grace) and "sanctifying grace". Both of those subsequent forms of grace are resistible. On the contrary Calvinists have considered the justifying grace as an irresistible grace.

History

Origins 
The notion of "prevenient grace" was developed by Augustine of Hippo (354 – 430), along with the notions of "operative grace" and the "cooperative grace". In reaction to Pelagianism, Augustine's stated that prevenient grace is necessary to prepare the human will for conversion. Pelagius had appealed to St. Ambrose (c. 339 – c. 397), to which Augustine replied a series of quotations from Ambrose which indicated the need for prevenient grace. Moreover, Augustine named the free will devoid of the help of prevenient grace, "captive free will". And, by the action of the grace, it becomes a "freed will" or literally a "freed free will".

Developments 
In 529, at the Second Council of Orange, the question at hand was whether the doctrines of Augustine on God's providence were to be affirmed, or if Semi-Pelagianism could be affirmed. Semi-Pelagianism was a moderate form of Pelagianism which teaches that the first step of salvation is by human will and not the grace of God. 

The determination of the Council could be considered "semi-Augustinian". It defined that faith, though a free act of man, resulted, even in its beginnings, from the grace of God, enlightening the human mind and enabling belief. This describes the operation of prevenient grace allowing the unregenerate to repent in faith. On the other hand, the Council of Orange condemned the Augustinian teaching of predestination to damnation.

The canons of the Council directly quoted Augustine's work related on the concept of prevenient grace (Canons 1, 2, 5, 6, 7) Boniface II (died in 532) writing to Caesarius of Arles, confirmed the notion of prevenient grace : "[W]e confirm by the authority of the Apostolic See your confession, in which in the Opposite way you explain that right faith in Christ and the beginning of all good will, according to Catholic truth, is inspired in the minds of individuals by the preceding grace of God."

In Arminian theology

Classical Arminianism 
Prevenient grace is a concept rooted in Arminian theology. Jacobus Arminius affirmed total depravity but believed that prevenient grace enables people to respond to God's offer of salvation:

"Concerning grace and free will, this is what I teach according to the Scriptures and orthodox consent: Free will is unable to begin or to perfect any true and spiritual good, without grace. …This grace [prævenit] goes before, accompanies, and follows; it excites, assists, operates that we will, and co operates lest we will in vain."

Theologian Robert E. Picirilli writes, quoting Arminius, that: "What Arminius meant by "prevenient grace" was that grace that precedes actual regeneration and which, except when finally resisted, inevitably leads to regeneration. He was quick to observe that this "assistance of the Holy Spirit" is of such sufficiency "as to keep at the greatest possible distance from Pelagianism."

Wesleyan Arminianism 

John Wesley in his sermon #85, "On Working Out Our Own Salvation", stated that :"prevenient grace elicits the first wish to please God, the first dawn of light concerning His will, and the first slight transient conviction of having sinned against Him."Wesley insisted on prevenient grace as a solution to two great problems in Christianity: the belief of original sin and the Protestant doctrine of salvation by grace alone.

Thomas Oden defines prevenient grace as "the grace that begins to enable one to choose further to cooperate with saving grace. By offering the will the restored capacity to respond to grace, the person then may freely and increasingly become an active, willing participant in receiving the conditions for justification."

Wesleyans generally distinguish two forms of call related to prevenient grace : 1. A universal call which is the secret influence of the Holy Spirit upon the conscience. 2. A direct call through the revealed word as found in the Holy Scriptures.

John Wesley adapted the Articles of Religion, which for use by American Methodists. With very similar language between it and Article VII of the Manual, Article VIII states, "The condition of man after the fall of Adam is such that he cannot turn and prepare himself, by his own natural strength and works, to faith, and calling upon God; wherefore we have no power to do good works, pleasant and acceptable to God, without the grace of God by Christ preventing [preceding] us, that we may have a good will, and working with us, when we have that good will" (emphasis added), language that was taken directly from Article X of the Thirty-Nine Articles of Religion adopted by the Church of England in 1563."

The Article VIII is official doctrine for many Wesleyan or Holiness movement denominations such as the United Methodist Church, the Church of the Nazarene, or the Pillar of Fire Church.

Infant baptism is seen in Methodism as a celebration of prevenient grace. Although infant baptism is important for the life journey of the faithful disciple, it is not essential.

Most Methodist hymnals have a section with hymns concerning prevenient grace, most recently The United Methodist Hymnal (1989). One of the best known hymns written about the doctrine is Charles Wesley's "Come, Sinners, to the Gospel Feast", which includes the lines, "Ye need not one be left behind, for God hath bid all humankind… the invitation is to all" (emphasis added).

Objections 
Some Calvinists (and others) derisively refer to the Wesleyan concept of prevenient grace as "universal enablement." They characterize the Wesleyan view as teaching that God has restored to every individual the ability to seek after God and choose salvation and as not being justified by the Bible. 

They argue that because this grace is supposedly given to all alike, the determining factor in salvation becomes the will of man. They see this dependence on the will and choice of the individual as a good work required for salvation and thus an implicit rejection of salvation by grace alone.

Wesleyans object that, according to their view, both the initiation and the activation of salvation is by grace alone; first through prevenient grace, then through justifying grace. Secondarily, concerning the determining factor in salvation, they remark that Calvinism teaches the compatibility of divine determinism and moral responsibility. In this Calvinist perspective, man is responsible for his choice when he acts voluntarily, even if his will is determined by God. Thus, as man comes to faith voluntarily, it follows that man is morally responsible for his faith. Then, it seems that if Calvinists want to remain consistent with their own thesis, they cannot affirm that the moral responsibility of the choice of faith makes this choice a good work.

In Roman Catholic theology
The Catechism of the Catholic Church explains, "No one can say 'Jesus is Lord' except by the Holy Spirit. Every time we begin to pray to Jesus it is the Holy Spirit who draws us on the way of prayer by his prevenient grace."

The Second Council of Orange of 529 stated that faith, though a free act, resulted even in its beginnings from the grace of God, enlightening the human mind and enabling belief.

In Canon 18 it is said "That grace is preceded by no merits. A reward is due to good works, if they are performed; but grace, which is not due, precedes, that they may be done [St. Prosper]." In canon 23 it is said that God prepares our wills that they may desire the good. Canon 25 states, "In every good work, it is not we who begin… but He (God) first inspires us with faith and love of Him, through no preceding merit on our part."

Prevenient grace was discussed in the fifth chapter of the sixth session of the Council of Trent (1545–63) which used the phrase: "a Dei per dominum Christum Iesum praeveniente gratia" (rendered "a predisposing grace of God through Jesus Christ"). Those who turned from God by sins are disposed by God's grace to turn back and become justified by freely assenting to that grace.

In Reformed theology
Calvinists have their own doctrine of prevenient grace, which they identify with the effectual calling and which is immediately and necessarily followed by faith. Because of the necessity of salvation following this dispensation of prevenient grace, the justifying grace is called irresistible grace.

The Calvinist form of prevenient grace is also related to common grace by which God shows general mercy to everyone, restrains sin, and gives humankind a knowledge of God and of their sinfulness and need of rescue from sin. Despite this grace has no salvific purpose, it is said to let people without excuse of not coming to God. Common grace explains also why people seem to come to God, but eventually seem to commit definitive apostasy. About that issue, Calvin formulated the concept of a temporary grace (sometimes called "evanescent grace") that appears and works for only a while in the reprobate but then to disappears. According to this concept, the Holy Spirit can create in some people effects which are indistinguishable from those of the irresistible grace of God, producing also visible "fruit". Temporal grace was also supported by later Calvinist theologians such as John Owen or Lorraine Boettner.

Objections 
Since Calvinist common grace leaves people absolutely incapable of coming to God, non-Calvinists do not believe it leaves them without excuse. Concerning the temporary grace supposed to explain apparent apostasy, non-Calvinists find it contrary to the revealed character of God, and leaving Christians without real assurance of salvation during their life.

Notes and references

Citations

Sources

External links

Methodism
Salvation in Protestantism
Evangelical theology
Grace in Christianity
Christian terminology
Arminianism
Christian soteriology